Albaredo Arnaboldi (Lombard: Albaréd) is a comune (municipality) in the Province of Pavia in the Italian region Lombardy, located about 40 km south of Milan and about 12 km southeast of Pavia.

Albaredo Arnaboldi borders the following municipalities: Barbianello, Belgioioso, Broni, Campospinoso, Casanova Lonati, Linarolo, Mezzanino, San Cipriano Po.

References 

Cities and towns in Lombardy
Articles which contain graphical timelines